Rachel Fulton Brown (born in ) is an Associate Professor of Medieval History, Fundamentals, and the College at the University of Chicago. Fulton Brown has authored a variety of texts on the topic of Christian studies and the Middle Ages, and a 2019 book chronicling her friendship with far-right figure Milo Yiannopoulos through Yiannopoulos's publishing imprint, Dangerous Books. Fulton Brown has also written for Breitbart. In December 2020, United States president Donald Trump announced an intent to appoint Fulton Brown to the Cultural Property Advisory Committee, which the official Whitehouse website described as a "key administration post".

Comments and blog entries published by Fulton Brown gained notable attention in academia as part of a broader discussion regarding white nationalism and medieval studies. As described by The New York Times:
The idea of medieval studies as a haven for white nationalist ideas gained ground when Rachel Fulton Brown, an associate professor of medieval history at the University of Chicago, began feuding with Dorothy Kim, an assistant professor of medieval English literature at Brandeis, after Dr. Kim, writing on Facebook, highlighted an old blog post of Dr. Fulton Brown’s titled "Three Cheers for White Men," calling it an example of "medievalists upholding white supremacy."

The article caused a furor, as scholars accused colleagues of providing screenshots of private Facebook conversations and surreptitious recordings of conference sessions to Mr. Yiannopoulos.
Fulton Brown subsequently cited Vox Day, a far-right activist, and promoted a conspiracy theory that the Christchurch mosque shootings may have been a false flag operation. Fulton Brown has often used her tenured status and academic platform to defend Yiannopoloulos, referring to his critics, for example, as "spineless cunts".

Bibliography

 From Judgment to Passion: Devotion to Christ and the Virgin Mary, 800–1200. 2005. ISBN 978-0231125512
 Mary and the Art of Prayer: The Hours of the Virgin in Medieval Christian Life and Thought. 2017. ISBN 978-0231181686
 Milo Chronicles: Devotions 2016 - 2019. 2019. ISBN 978-9527303573
 Centrism Games: A Modern Dunciad. 2021. ISBN 978-0578870816

Notes

References
Fulton Brown, Rachel. 2019. Milo Chronicles: Devotions 2016 - 2019. Dangerous Books. .
Livingstone, Josephine. 2017a. "A University of Chicago professor has gone off on Milo Yiannopoulis’s opponents, calling them 'spineless c*nts'." The New Republic, February 21, 2017. Online. Last accessed July 12, 2020.
Livingstone, Josephine. 2017b. "University History Departments Have a Race Problem". October 25, 2017. The New Republic, October 25, 2017. Online. Last accessed July 12, 2020
Scheussler, Jennifer. 2019. "Medieval Scholars Joust With White Nationalists. And One Another." The New York Times, May 5, 2019. Online. Last accessed July 11, 2020.
Whitehouse.gov. 2020. "President Donald J. Trump Announces Intent to Appoint Individuals to Key Administration Posts". Whitehouse.gov, December 22, 2020. Online. Last accessed December 23, 2020.

External links
Rachel Fulton Brown at the University of Chicago
Fulton Brown's personal University of Chicago website

American medievalists
Living people
University of Chicago faculty
Year of birth missing (living people)